Ian Rapoport is an American sportswriter, pundit, and television analyst who primarily covers the National Football League (NFL).

Career
Rapoport started his career for the Jackson Clarion-Ledger in 2004 covering the Mississippi State Bulldogs. He moved on to The Birmingham News in 2006 to cover the Alabama Crimson Tide. As reported on Pardon My Take ("PMT"), he applied for a job with the Boston Herald on the basis that he would cover Bill Belichick in the same manner he covered Nick Saban. After receiving the job, he served as a Patriots beat reporter for the Boston Herald for three seasons starting in 2009. Rapoport joined the NFL Network in 2012.

References

Living people
American sportswriters
Columbia University alumni
Boston Herald people
21st-century American journalists
Year of birth missing (living people)